John Barrett (1753 – 15 November 1821) of Trinity College Dublin, Ireland, was a noted Hebrew scholar.

Career
Barrett was born the son of a Church of Ireland priest in County Laois. He was known as a Trinity College Dublin don for most of his career and recognized as an eccentric. He saved his income and left £80,000 "to feed the hungry and clothe the naked" upon his death.

References

External links
 
 Barrett writing on Jonathan Swift

1753 births
1821 deaths
People from County Laois
Academics of Trinity College Dublin